Abbotsford is a house on the east side of Warrington Road, Cuddington, Cheshire, England.  It is recorded in the National Heritage List for England as a designated Grade II listed building.

The house was built in 1890 for Jabez S. Thompson of Northwich and designed by the Chester architect John Douglas.  The house is constructed in Ruabon red brick with Lakeland slate roofs.  Its plan is irregular, with a front of five bays which includes two gables and plaster diapering.

See also

 Listed buildings in Cuddington, Cheshire
 List of houses and associated buildings by John Douglas

References

Grade II listed buildings in Cheshire
Houses completed in 1890
Country houses in Cheshire
John Douglas buildings
Grade II listed houses